Liana Dumitrescu (20 January 1973 – 27 January 2011) was a Romanian politician and the leader of the Association of Macedonians of Romania, a political party representing the ethnic Macedonians of Romania. She served in the Chamber of Deputies between 2004 and 2011.

References

1973 births
2011 deaths
Members of the Chamber of Deputies (Romania)
Romanian politicians of ethnic minority parties
People from Craiova
21st-century Romanian women politicians
21st-century Romanian politicians
Romanian people of Macedonian descent